Anna Beer is a British author and lecturer, primarily known for her work as a biographer.

Her particular interests as a biographer are "the relationship between literature, politics and history,"[4] (which was the basis for her life of John Milton, 2008) and the rediscovery of neglected lives, the motivation both for her book about Bess Throckmorton, the wife of Sir Walter Ralegh (2004) and her exploration of the lives and work of female composers Sounds and Sweet Airs: the forgotten women of classical music which was published by Oneworld Publications in 2016 and shortlisted for the Royal Philharmonic Society Awards in 2017 for Creative Communication.

She was Lecturer in Literature at the Department for Continuing Education at the University of Oxford between 2003 and 2010, and remains a Fellow of Kellogg College.

Peter Ackroyd described Beer's biography of Milton as "a persuasive reading of the power and complexity of Paradise Lost," while former Poet Laureate Andrew Motion esteems it "a reliable guide to nonspecialists" and "the anniversary present he [Milton] deserves." Philip Pullman called it 'a beautifully clear account of a richly complex life...Fascinatingly vivid...It's the best narrative I've read of the life of our greatest public poet'.

Bibliography
 Ackroyd, Peter. "Peter Ackroyd examines the legacy of Milton." The Times. 22 February 2008. (accessed April 6, 2010).
 Beer, Anna. Bess: the Life of Lady Ralegh, Wife to Sir Walter. Constable and Robinson. 2004. 
 Beer, Anna. Milton: Poet, Pamphleteer and Patriot. 1st Edition. St Ives Printing and Publishing Company: Bloomsbury, 2008. 
 Beer, Anna. John Milton: Poet, Pamphleteer and Patriot. Lecture. Produced by Oxford University Department for Continuing Education. Performed by Anna Beer. 2008.
 Beer, Anna. Sounds and Sweet Airs: The Forgotten Women of Classical Music. Oneworld Publications. Forthcoming 2016. 
 Crown, Sarah, and Anna Beer. "Anna Beer on her new biography of poet John Milton." The Guardian Books Podcast. 2008. Podcast.
 guardian.co.uk. "Anna Beer." guardian.co.uk. 6 April 2010. (accessed April 6, 2010).
 Motion, Andrew. "The mystery of genius." The Guardian''. 19 January 2008. (accessed April 6, 2010).

Notes

English biographers
English literary critics
Women literary critics
John Milton
Fellows of Kellogg College, Oxford
Living people
Year of birth missing (living people)